Hide the Kitchen Knives is an album by The Paper Chase.

Track listing

I Did a Terrible Thing
Where Have Those Hands Been?
I'm Gonna Spend the Rest of My Life Lying
A Nice Family Dinner for Once
Don't You Wish You Had Somemore
I Tried So Hard to Be Good
A Little Place Called Trust
Sleep with the Fishes
So, How Goes the Good Fight
God Forgive Us All
AliverAlungAkidneyAthumb
Drive Carefully, Dear
Out Come the Knives

References

2002 albums
The Paper Chase (band) albums
Kill Rock Stars albums